Zara Mohammed (born c.1991) is a Scottish faith leader currently serving as Secretary General of the Muslim Council of Britain since 2021. She is the first woman to lead the organisation in its history.

Biography
Mohammed's grandparents immigrated to Britain from Multan, Pakistan. She was born in Glasgow, Scotland, and studied at the University of Strathclyde where she graduated with an LLB in Human Rights Law. In 2016, she became the first woman to lead the Federation of Student Islamic Societies (FOSIS).

Mohammed previously served as the Assistant Secretary General for the Muslim Council of Britain (MCB), and was elected Secretary General of the organisation in 2021 after receiving the majority of affiliate votes over her competitor, Ajmal Masroor. This was the first time a woman had held the position; Mohammed was additionally the youngest, as well as the first Scottish, person to serve in the role.

On 19 February 2021, Mohammed met with the Paymaster General Penny Mordaunt, despite that the Government had cut ties with MCB since 2009, after one of its leaders allegedly supported violence against Israel.

Woman's Hour controversy 
On 4 February 2021, Mohammed appeared as a guest on the BBC Radio 4 programme Woman's Hour to discuss her election as secretary general. During the interview, presenter Emma Barnett repeatedly questioned, and interrupted, Mohammed on the number of female imams in the United Kingdom. Footage of the interview was uploaded to Woman's Hours Twitter page, but was removed after subsequent backlash over Barnett's perceived hostility.

Subsequently, an open letter was published criticising Barnett's line of questioning and tone during the interview. Signatories included politicians Sayeeda Warsi and Diane Abbott, writer Yassmin Abdel-Magied and comedian Deborah Frances-White. A BBC spokesperson said the corporation would reply "in due course".

References and sources

1990s births
Alumni of the University of Strathclyde
People from Glasgow
21st-century British women politicians
Scottish Muslims
Scottish people of Pakistani descent
Muslim activists
Living people